Togo Dennis West Jr. (June 21, 1942 – March 8, 2018) was an American attorney and public official. A Democrat, he was the third person to occupy the post of Secretary of Veterans Affairs during the Bill Clinton administration serving from 1998 until his resignation in 2000. He was the second African American to be Secretary of Veterans Affairs.

Early life
West was born in Winston-Salem, North Carolina, where he became an Eagle Scout with Bronze Palms, and attended Atkins High School (where his parents were teachers), graduating as valedictorian in June 1960.

He subsequently entered Howard University, obtaining a Bachelor of Science degree in electrical engineering in 1965. He received his Juris Doctor degree from the Howard University School of Law in 1968, receiving cum laude honors and graduating first in his class.

While a freshman at Howard University, he became a brother of Zeta Phi chapter of Alpha Phi Omega service fraternity. West was a member of the Kappa Psi chapter of Omega Psi Phi fraternity.

Early career
While a law student at Howard, West became the managing editor for the Howard Law Journal. Around that time, he met Gail Berry, who later became his wife.

A member of St. John's Episcopal Church, Lafayette Square, he served as a vestryman and Senior Warden.

West was a member of the National Executive Board of the Boy Scouts of America, the organization's governing body. He was named a Distinguished Eagle Scout by the Boy Scouts of America and was awarded the Silver Buffalo Award for his national contributions to America's youth. He previously served as the president of the National Capital Area Council of the Boy Scouts of America.

Military and government career
After completing law school and clerking for federal District Judge Harold R. Tyler Jr., West entered the United States Army. He was in the Army Field Artillery Corps from 1965 to 1968, then attended The JAG School at the University of Virginia. He entered U.S. Army JAG Corps, and he served as an Army lawyer from 1969 to 1973.

From his military service, he earned the Legion of Merit and the Meritorious Service Medal.  He subsequently practiced law at the firm of Covington & Burling before being appointed an associate deputy attorney general in the administration of President Gerald Ford.

West held several posts in the administration of Jimmy Carter: General Counsel of the Navy (1977–79), Special Assistant to the Secretary and to the Deputy Secretary of Defense (1979), and General Counsel of the Department of Defense (1980–81). As the Secretary of the Army, West weighed in on the Aberdeen scandal, prompting stricter enforcement and investigation into the Army's sexual harassment policies.

West returned to private practice in 1981 with the firm of Patterson Belknap Webb & Tyler and later worked as senior vice president for government relations of the Northrop Corporation until he became a member of the Clinton administration. In 1996, as Secretary of the Army, West earned the Grand-Officer of the Order of Military Merit by the Brazilian President Fernando Henrique Cardoso.

West was nominated by President Bill Clinton on January 27, 1998, during Clinton's second term, and was confirmed by the Senate on May 4, 1998. He had previously served as Secretary of the Army from 1993 to 1998.  From January 2, 1998, through May 4, 1998, he served a dual role as Acting Secretary of Veterans Affairs and Secretary of the Army while awaiting confirmation as Secretary of Veterans Affairs.

Post-government career 
After leaving office, West practiced law and served on the boards of various institutions. From 2004 to 2006, he served as president of the Joint Center for Political and Economic Studies, a Washington-based think tank focused on issues of concern to minorities.  He was a strong supporter of and past board member of the Mount Vernon preservation society.

West and former Chief of Naval Operations retired admiral Vernon Clark led the Defense Department's investigation into the Fort Hood massacre, issuing a report in January 2010.

West died of a heart attack on March 8, 2018, at the age of 75, while on a cruise between Barbados and Puerto Rico. He was interred at Arlington National Cemetery on April 26, 2018.

References

External links

|-

|-

1942 births
2018 deaths
20th-century American politicians
African-American Episcopalians
African-American members of the Cabinet of the United States
African-American United States Army personnel
American Episcopalians
Burials at Arlington National Cemetery
Clinton administration cabinet members
General Counsels of the United States Navy
Howard University School of Law alumni
Military personnel from North Carolina
National Executive Board of the Boy Scouts of America members
North Carolina Democrats
North Carolina lawyers
Patterson Belknap Webb & Tyler people
People associated with Covington & Burling
Politicians from Winston-Salem, North Carolina
Recipients of the Legion of Merit
Recipients of the Order of Military Merit (Brazil)
United States Army officers
United States Secretaries of the Army
United States Secretaries of Veterans Affairs
People who died at sea